Kai Tak is an underground MTR rapid transit station located on the Tuen Ma line, in the Kai Tak Development area of Hong Kong (near the old east apron of the former Kai Tak Airport in Kowloon City District). The station was opened on 14 February 2020 as part of the Tuen Ma line's first phase. It will provide access to the multi-purpose Kai Tak Sports Park, currently under construction, as well as other facilities. The station was built as part of the Sha Tin to Central Link (SCL).

History
The contract to construct Kai Tak station (and the approach tunnels), valued at HK$1,422,000,000, was awarded on 25 April 2013 to the Kaden-Chun Wo joint venture. The station was built using the cut-and-cover method. A topping-out ceremony was held on 16 July 2015. It was the second SCL station to be topped out, after Hin Keng.

The station opened on 14 February 2020. It acted as the southern terminus for the Ma On Shan line (renamed Tuen Ma Line Phase 1 on the same day) until the entire  opened on 27 June 2021.

The station was temporarily closed on 17 July 2020 after a wartime bomb was found nearby. The station reopened on the morning of the next day.

Features
The station includes an artwork within the adit leading to Exit A. Entitled Memories of Kai Tak – 1925–1998, the piece comprises a display of more than 30 photos and other materials related to the former Kai Tak Airport. It was designed by Cliff Dunnaway, author of two books about Hong Kong's aviation history.

Station layout
The station has two levels: a concourse level above a lower level with an island platform.

Exits

A: Kai Ching Estate 
B: Muk Yuen Street
C: AIRSIDE and Kai Tak Underground Shopping Street (under construction)
D: OASIS KAI TAK

Gallery

References

Kai Tak Development
Sha Tin to Central Link
Tuen Ma line
Kowloon City District
MTR stations in Kowloon
Railway stations in Hong Kong opened in 2020